The Romania women's national football team represents Romania in international women's football. Their most recent competition is qualification for the 2015 FIFA Women's World Cup. Despite not gaining as much success as the men's, the women's team has been improving greatly, and almost qualified for UEFA Women's Euro and FIFA Women's World Cup.

Results and fixtures
The following is a list of matches in the last 12 months, as well as any future matches that have been scheduled.
Legend

2022

2023

Coaching staff

Current coaching staff

Managerial history

Players

Current squad
The following squad were called up for the UEFA Women's Euro 2022 qualifying Group H match against Croatia on 23 February 2021.

Caps and goals accurate up to 22 February 2021.

Recent call ups
The following players have been called up to the Romania squad in the past 12 months.

Records

*Active players in bold, statistics correct as of 27 October 2021.

Most capped players

Top goalscorers

Competitive record

FIFA Women's World Cup

UEFA Women's Championship

See also

Sport in Romania
Football in Romania
Women's football in Romania

 Romania women's national under-19 football team
 Romania women's national under-17 football team

Notes

References

External links
Official website
FIFA profile

 
national
European women's national association football teams